Aalborg Vestby railway station is a railway station serving the district of Vestbyen in the city of Aalborg, Denmark.

The station is located on the Vendsyssel Line from Aalborg to Frederikshavn. It opened in 2003 as part of the new Aalborg Commuter Rail service. The train services are operated by the railway companies DSB and Nordjyske Jernbaner.

History 
The station opened in 2003 as a part of the new Aalborg Commuter Rail service.

Operations 
The train services are operated by the railway companies DSB and Nordjyske Jernbaner. The station offers direct InterCityLyn services to Copenhagen and Aalborg Airport operated by DSB as well as regional train services to Aalborg, Hjørring and Frederikshavn operated by Nordjyske Jernbaner.

References

External links

 Banedanmark – government agency responsible for maintenance and traffic control of most of the Danish railway network
 DSB – largest Danish train operating company
 Nordjyske Jernbaner – Danish railway company operating in North Jutland Region
 Danske Jernbaner – website with information on railway history in Denmark
 Nordjyllands Jernbaner – website with information on railway history in North Jutland

Railway stations in Aalborg
Railway stations opened in 2003
Railway stations in Denmark opened in the 21st century